Caprinia unicoloralis is a species of moth of the family Crambidae. It was described by George Hamilton Kenrick in 1907 and it is found in Papua New Guinea.

It has a wingspan of 36 mm.

References

Spilomelinae
Moths described in 1907